David Stahl may refer to:

 David Stahl (conductor) (1949–2010), American conductor
 David Henry Stahl (1920–1970), American attorney and federal judge
 David Stahl (biologist), American scientist and professor of environmental engineering
 David Stahl, mayor of East Brunswick, New Jersey